The Devonshire White Paper or Devonshire Declaration was a document written in 1923 by the colonial secretary Victor Cavendish, 9th Duke of Devonshire, regarding the status of settlers and natives in the Kenya Colony, and East Africa more broadly. The paper stated that whenever the interests of the native Africans clashed with those of Asian, European, or Arab settlers, those of the Africans should prevail. The Declaration blocked the move towards self-government advocated by the colonialists, and in its place advocated a policy of trusteeship, whereby the imperial state would protect the interests of Africans. Although the Paper had little effect on the welfare of native Africans, it nonetheless set a precedent for future conflict resolution between the various groups living in the colony.

Background
The Legislative Council established to govern the East African Protectorate originally consisted of three appointed white settlers. However, other white settlers in the colony resented the fact that they could not elect representatives to the Council, and, led by Lord Delamere, began to demand "no taxation without representation". In 1916, white settlers were elected to the Council, and focused predominantly on European settler issues.

The Asian community had, in 1911, been granted appointed seats on the non-official (opposition) side of the Legislative Council, two occupied by Indians and one by an Arab. However, seeing the success of the European settlers in demanding elective representation, they began to demand the same privilege. They previously petitioned the colonial government for the right to purchase land in the fertile White Highlands, but this was denied and restricted to white settlers. Their demands for less restrictive policies on Indians, such as lenient immigration laws on Asians, frequently put them at odds with the European settlers.

Meanwhile, in Southern Rhodesia (now Zimbabwe) and the Union of South Africa (now South Africa), the Boers and European settlers had managed to exclude the native African population completely from the governance of these territories. The British settlers in Kenya were increasingly interested in the political development of these places, and desired that such a form of government be implemented in Kenya. Therefore, in 1923, representatives of the white settlers were sent to London to negotiate for white minority rule in Kenya, as well as the exclusion of Asians from the White Highlands and restricted Indian migration into the colony. In turn, an Asian delegation was sent to lobby for the promotion of Asian interests, including their opposition to the restrictive immigration into the colony and restriction on land ownership in the White Highlands. The missionaries in the colony, sympathetic to the native African population, were similarly alarmed with the idea of white minority rule, and sent their own delegation to London to counter the settlers' proposals.

The White Paper
In Britain, various people such as John Ainsworth, Provincial Commissioner of Nyanza Province, and Lord Lugard, had previously argued that Kenya "is primarily a Black man's country and can never be a European colony" and that "it was contrary to ... British colonial policy that the small Kenyan settler community should have political control over large native communities." On 23 July 1923, after deliberation on "the Indian question", the cabinet approved the right of the colonial government in Britain, and not the settlers, to impose limitations on immigration from India, but also continued to restrict Indian ownership of land in the so-called White Highlands. Based on this cabinet decision, the Duke of Devonshire, who was colonial secretary at the time, issued the "white paper", stating:

Impact
The Paper was intended to serve as a compromise between Indian interests and those of the Europeans, despite its affirmation of African paramountcy. Nevertheless, the Paper allowed for the (slow) improvement of African conditions, such as the establishment of technical schools for Africans by a 1924 Education Ordinance, as well as the appointment of John Arthur, a Christian missionary, to the Legislative Council in order to represent African interests. It also allowed for the formation of an African party, the Kikuyu Central Association, which presented African grievances to the colonial government.

Although the Indians were prevented from settling in the White Highlands, they were granted five seats on the Legislative Council and immigration restrictions imposed on them by the white settlers were removed.

The White Paper was used by the British government to retain control over the Kenya Colony, and is cited as one reason why Kenya did not develop as a white minority ruled country, as South Africa and Southern Rhodesia did.

References 

History of Kenya
East Africa Protectorate
British Kenya
Legislative Council of Kenya
1923 documents
Law of the United Kingdom
Government statements
Statements (law)
1923 in law
1920s in Kenya
1923 in the British Empire